Qayah Qeshlaqi (also Romanized as Qayah Qeshlāqī) is a village in Mehmandust Rural District, Kuraim District, Nir County, Ardabil Province, Iran. At the 2006 census, its population was 129, in 27 families.

References 

Towns and villages in Nir County